The Kelantan River (named Sungai Kelantan in  the standard Malay language or Sunga Kelate as it is pronounced in Kelantanese language) is the major river in Kelantan, Malaysia. It drains a catchment area of about 11900 km²
in north-east Malaysia including part of the Taman Negara National Park, and flows northwards into the South China Sea. The rainfall over the area varies between 0 mm in the dry season (March–May) to 1750 mm in the monsoon season (November–January). The average runoff from the area is about 500 m³/s.

Name and extent

The description of the river is complicated by the local naming convention: instead of using the name Kelantan river from estuary to source, the name is only used for the section from the estuary to the confluence of its two main tributaries, the Galas River and the Lebir River, near the town of Kuala Krai. The same naming convention applies to these tributaries. Thus to describe the main river from source to mouth involves four names: the River Betis (first 20 miles from the source), then the River Nenggiri, then the River Galas, and finally the Kelantan River.

Route

The river tributaries rise in the forested mountains in Gua Musang region in southern Kelantan, where many Orang Asli tribes live. The area is known for its limestone outcrops and caves. Along the River Nenggeri section some cave systems show evidence of habitation going back to 9000 years ago, such as Gua Cha near Kuala Betis.

Lower down, Malay villages dot the banks of the river which passes through one of the most densely populated flood plains on the Malay Peninsula whose padi fields produce around 12% of Malaysian rice production.

The river flows past seven important towns, from south to north: Kuala Krai, Tanah Merah, Machang, Pasir Mas, Tumpat, the state capital Kota Bharu, as well as Pengkalan Chepa, which lies near the mouth of the river. Towards the estuary there are several islands in the river.

The area around the actual estuary, known as Kuala Besar, is dotted with picturesque fishing villages, which are also well known for the production of batik (a local patterned material produced by waxing and dyeing cloth) for which the State of Kelantan is famous. The mouth of the Kelantan River is also notable for being the site where Japanese troops first landed during their invasion of Malaya in December 1941.

Flooding

The Kelantan River regularly overspills its banks during the months of November to February because of the northeast monsoon season. The estimate flood volume under the 50 year flood condition at Kusial Bridge is about 6 billion m3. Severe flooding occurred in 1926 and 1967. In the 1967 floods 84% of the Kelantan population (537,000 people) were badly affected. Some 125,000 people were evacuated and 38 drowned.

More recently a telemetric flood forecasting system has been installed to give warning of high river levels. Some of the worst floods in recent years have been:

See also
 List of rivers of Malaysia

References

External links

 Kelantan online river level data - click Sg.Kelantan for current week's river level readings taken every hour - or click the number in the Station id column to plot a graph.
 Taman Negara Taman Negara
  Kelantan

Rivers of Kelantan
Rivers of Malaysia